L'Homme. Revue française d'anthropologie, is a French anthropological journal established in 1961 by Émile Benveniste, Pierre Gourou, and Claude Lévi-Strauss at the École pratique des hautes études, as a French counterpart to Man and American Anthropologist.

In 1996 the editorship passed from Jean Pouillon, who had held the post from the journal's inception, to Jean Jamin. Since 2016, Cléo Carastro and Caterina Guenzi are the two editors of the journal.

References

External links
 

French-language journals
Anthropology journals
Quarterly journals
Publications established in 1961